The 1962 Utah State Aggies football team was an American football team that represented Utah State University as an independent during the 1962 NCAA University Division football season. In their fourth season under head coach John Ralston, the Aggies compiled an 8–2 record and outscored all opponents by a total of 273 to 139.

The team's statistical leaders included Jim Turner with 414 passing yards and 70 points scored (six touchdowns, 25 extra points, and three field goals), Roger Leonard with 348 rushing yards, and John Matthews with 223 receiving yards. Other notable players on the 1962 team included Bill Munson, who later played quarterback for the Los Angeles Rams and Detroit Lions, and Steve Shafer, who later played defensive back for the BC Lions.

Schedule

References

Utah State
Utah State Aggies football seasons
Utah State Aggies football